The Union of People's Democracy (Énosi Laikís Dimokratías, abbreviated ELD, ΕΛΔ) was a Greek political party, established in 1941, during the Nazi occupation. It took part in the group of political parties that formed the National Liberation Front (EAM). Leader of the party was Professor Alexandros Svolos and general secretary was Ilias Tsirimokos. After the occupation, changed its name into the Socialist Party-Union of People's Democracy and then collaborated with the Democratic Party of Working People (DKEL). In January 1950, the party issued its programme, which was printed by the party newspaper Machi ("battle"). With the publication of its programme, the party declared its participation in the Democratic Block that took part in the elections of March 5, 1950, where it provided 8 of 18 Members of Parliament coming from the block.

References
 Ilias Nikolakopoulos, «Κόμματα και Βουλευτικές Εκλογές στην Ελλάδα 1946-1964», Εθνικό Κέντρο Κοινωνικών Ερευνών, Αθήνα 2000 pp. 162 and 395.
 «Το πρόγραμμα του Σοσιαλιστικού Κόμματος ΕΛΔ» ELD party programme

1941 establishments in Greece
Political parties established in 1941
Defunct socialist parties in Greece
National Liberation Front (Greece)